Vatnsfell is an Icelandic hydroelectric power station  situated in the Highlands of Iceland, at the south end of lake Þórisvatn, just before the Sprengisandur highland road.

The power station went online in 2001. It is run by Landsvirkjun and generates electricity during the peak demand winter months. Lead engineering services were provided by Mannvit Engineering.

References

External links 

 

Hydroelectric power stations in Iceland